Yuryakh-Kyuyore (Ürex Küöre) is a rural locality (a selo) in Ozhulunsky Rural Okrug of Churapchinsky District in the Sakha Republic, Russia. Its population as of the 2010 Census was 75; down from 112 recorded in the 2002 Census.

References

Notes

Sources
Official website of the Sakha Republic. Registry of the Administrative-Territorial Divisions of the Sakha Republic. Churapchinsky District. 

Rural localities in Churapchinsky District